Măcriș River may refer to:

 Măcriș, a tributary of the Pârâul Urșanilor in Vâlcea County
 Măcriș River (Șușița)

See also 
 Măcrișu River (disambiguation)
 Macris